Dinara Safina was the defending champion, but she chose not to participate.

Anna Chakvetadze won the title, defeating Johanna Larsson in the final, 6–1, 6–2. This was the final WTA singles title that Chakvetadze won before her retirement in 2013.

Seeds

Main draw

Finals

Top half

Bottom half

References
Main Draw
Qualifying Draw

Singles
Banka Koper Slovenia Open